Raphael Trotman (born 1966) is a Guyanese lawyer and politician. He was the Speaker of the National Assembly of Guyana from 2011 to 2015. He was the country's Minister for Natural Resources from 2015 to 2020.

A former executive member of the People's National Congress Reform, Trotman co-founded the Alliance For Change (AFC) in 2005 along with Khemraj Ramjattan and Sheila Holder.  Officially launched on October 29, 2005, the AFC received 8.3% of the national vote and won 5 of the 65 seats in the August 2006 elections, becoming the third largest political party in Guyana.

Trotman was initially elected to Parliament in 1998 as a member of the People's National Congress Reform.  Trotman resigned the PNCR on May 27, 2005 but did not resign his Parliamentary seat until 27 December 2005, well after the launch of his new political party.

In the 2006 elections, Trotman was his party's presidential candidate.

References

External links
  Alliance For Change Homepage

1966 births
Living people
20th-century Guyanese lawyers
Alliance for Change (Guyana) politicians
People's National Congress (Guyana) politicians
Government ministers of Guyana
Speakers of the National Assembly (Guyana)